Saint Peris's Church is a parish church of the Church in Wales in Nant Peris, Gwynedd, Wales.

History
The church of St Peris is in the village Nant Peris.

The church dates from at least the 14th century. The transepts are 15th- or 16th-century. The church was extended eastwards and the chancel rebuilt in the 17th century.

A restoration was carried out by Henry Kennedy of Bangor in 1848, and again in 1893 when the church was re-plastered and re-decorated, with some new joinery work for £230. More work was completed in 1899 when the walls were boarded, an oak reredos installed and encaustic tiles laid round the altar. This was carried out by Evan Parry of Menai Bridge.

The lychgate dates from 1929.

Stained glass

The east window was the gift of John Christopher Lloyd Williams in 1926 and was designed by W. Aikman.

Parish

The church is in the parish of Bro Eryri, which encompasses:
Christ Church, Deiniolen
St Deiniol's Church, Llanddeiniolen
St Helen's Church, Penisa'r Waun
St Michael's Church, Llanrug
St Padarn's Church, Llanberis

References

External links
 

Church in Wales church buildings
Buildings and structures in Gwynedd
Grade II* listed churches in Gwynedd
Saint Peris's Church